Adam Zbořil (born August 28, 1995) is a Czech professional ice hockey forward currently playing for BK Mladá Boleslav of the Czech Extraliga. He is the older brother of Boston Bruins prospect Jakub Zbořil.

Zbořil began playing for HC Kometa Brno's various junior teams before spending one season in the Quebec Major Junior Hockey League in the 2012–13 season with Acadie–Bathurst Titan. He then joined SaiPa in 2013 and played one game in Liiga for them during the 2015-16 season.

References

External links

1995 births
Living people
Acadie–Bathurst Titan players
Czech ice hockey forwards
KeuPa HT players
Iisalmen Peli-Karhut players
BK Mladá Boleslav players
HC Nové Zámky players
SaiPa players
Czech expatriate ice hockey players in Canada
Czech expatriate ice hockey players in Finland
Ice hockey people from Brno